The 1917 Florida Gators football team represented the University of Florida during the 1917 college football season. The season was Alfred L. Buser's first of three as the head coach of the Florida Gators football team.  The 1917 season was a disappointment; the team completed their football season with an SIAA conference record of 1–3 and an overall record of 2–4.

Before the season
Coach Buser was a former All-American lineman for the Wisconsin Badgers, and promised to bring a Midwestern power football style of play to revive the Gators after the winless 1916 season. Captain "Rowdy Bill" Wilkinson was the team's only returning letterman.

Schedule

Season summary

South Carolina

Sources:

On opening day, Florida came from behind with three touchdowns in the third quarter to beat South Carolina 21–13.

The starting lineup was Clemmons (left end), Wurtrich (left tackle), Connell (left guard), Wells (center), Swink (right guard), Brannon (right tackle), Thomas (right end), Fuller (quarterback), Wilkinson (left halfback), Ball (right halfback), Lightsey (fullback).

Tulane

Sources:

Tulane overwhelmed the Gators 52–0, several times skirting the ends for long gains. The  Gators were frequently penalized for offsides and hurdling.

The starting lineup was Clemmons (left end), Wurtrich (left tackle), Connell (left guard), Wells (center), Otto (right guard), Brannon (right tackle), Thomas (right end), Fuller (quarterback), Wilkinson (left halfback), Ball (right halfback), Lightsey (fullback).

Florida Southern

Sources:

After the first ten minutes, Florida replaced its backfield with second-string men.

The starting lineup was Clemmons (left end), Wutrich (left tackle), Swink (left guard), Dye (center), Cornell (right guard), Brannon (right tackle), Thomas (right end), Fuller (quarterback), Marshall (left halfback), Leifeste (right halfback), Lightsey (fullback).

Auburn

Sources:

Florida endured its sixth-straight loss to coach Mike Donahue's Auburn team. The Plainsmen had their biggest win on the season over Florida, 68–0.

The starting lineup was Clemmons (left end), Wutrich (left tackle), Connell (left guard), Dye (center), Otto (right guard), Brannon (right tackle), Thomas (right end), Fuller (quarterback), Wilkinson (left halfback), Ball (right halfback), Fernald (fullback).

Clemson

Sources:

Clemson defeated the Gators 55–7. Florida's only score came on a forward pass, Loomis to Thomas.

The starting lineup was Clemmons (left end), Wutrich (left tackle), Connell (left guard), Dye (center), Otto (right guard), Brannon (right tackle), Thomas (right end), Loomis (quarterback), Wilkinson (left halfback), Ball (right halfback), Lightsey (fullback).

Kentucky

Sources:

On Thanksgiving, in the school's first-ever game against the Kentucky Wildcats, Florida lost 52–0. Kentucky used its substitutes by the second half.

The starting lineup was Clemmons (left end), Wuthrich (left tackle), Connell (left guard), Dye (center), Gunn (right guard), Brannon (right tackle), Thomas (right end), Loomis (quarterback), Wilkinson (left halfback), Ball (right halfback), Fernald (fullback).

Personnel

Line

Backfield

Coaching staff
Head coach: Al Buser
Manager: W. E. Stone
Assistant managers: E. B. Casler, J. W. Dalton

References

Bibliography
 

Florida
Florida Gators football seasons
Florida Gators football